The Smith Mountain Lake Airport (FAA W91) is a privately owned airport open to the public located  southeast of Moneta, in Bedford County, Virginia, USA. The facility serves primarily general aviation for the areas around Smith Mountain Lake. 
In November 2013, longtime airport owner Joe Borgess sold  the airport to a New Jersey couple for approximately one million dollars. Mark A. Dalton, of Mark A. Dalton & Company REALTORS in Lynchburg, VA brokered the sale.

External links 

Airports in Virginia
Buildings and structures in Bedford County, Virginia
Transportation in Bedford County, Virginia
Privately owned airports